This is a list of players named as All-Pros based on their performance in the 1968 AFL  and NFL season.  These lists provide a perspective into how players were judged against their peers by critics of their time.  Players representing both the National Football League (NFL) and American Football League (AFL) are included.

Selectors
Teams were selected by several publications and wire services: the Associated Press (AP), the Newspaper Enterprise Association (NEA), the New York Daily News (NYDN), Pro Football Weekly (PFW), the Pro Football Writers of America (PFWA), the Sporting News (SN) and the United Press International (UPI).

The PFWA selected a true "All-Pro" team which included players from both the NFL and AFL.  The AP, NEA, Daily News and UPI selected one team for each league, which are  referred to as "All-NFL" and "All-AFL" teams.  Pro Football Weekly named both a unified All-Pro team as well as All-NFL and All-AFL teams representing each of the leagues individually.  The Sporting News named a single All-AFL team and All-Conference teams representing each of the two NFL conferences.

All of the publications named both first-team and second-team performers, with the exception of Pro Football Weekly and the Sporting News, which only selected only a first-team.

NFL All-Pros
Eleven NFL players were named to the first-team of every list presented here: Lem Barney, Gene Hickerson, Deacon Jones, Leroy Kelly, Bob Lilly, Billy Lothridge, John Mackey, Ralph Neely, Merlin Olsen, Gale Sayers and Larry Wilson.

Note: only the Pro Football Writers and Sporting News teams include special teams players.

Key (NFL)
AP = Associated Press All-NFL team
NEA = Newspaper Enterprise Association All-NFL team
NYDN = New York Daily News  All-NFL team
PFW = Pro Football Weekly All-Pro team
PFW-NFL = Pro Football Weekly All-NFL team
PFWA = Pro Football Writers of America All-Pro team
SN = Sporting News All-Conference team
UPI = United Press International  All-NFL team
 denotes a tie in balloting

AFL All-Pros
Three AFL players were named to the first-team of every list presented here: Lance Alworth, Joe Namath and George Webster.

Key (AFL)
AP = Associated Press All-AFL team
NEA = Newspaper Enterprise Association All-AFL team
NYDN = New York Daily News  All-AFL team
PFW = Pro Football Weekly All-Pro team
PFW-AFL = Pro Football Weekly All-AFL team
PFWA = Pro Football Writers of America All-Pro team
SN = Sporting News All-AFL team
UPI = United Press International  All-AFL team
 denotes a tie in balloting

References

NFL All-Pros from Pro-Football-Reference.com
AFL All-Pros from Pro-Football-Reference.com

All-Pro Teams
Allpro
1968 American Football League season